The German city of Hildesheim, c. 30 kilometres south of Hanover, was the target of eight Allied air raids in 1944 and 1945 and suffered considerable bomb damage.

Hildesheim during World War II
In 1939 Hildesheim had about 72,000 inhabitants. For most of the war Hildesheim was regarded as a minor target by British Bomber Command mainly because the military potential of the industry in and around Hildesheim was underestimated and classified as 'minor plants in major industries, or major plants in minor industries'.

However, a branch of the Vereinigte Deutsche Metallwerke (United German Metalworks) named VDM-Halbzeugwerke in the town produced aircraft parts for constant speed propellers, landing gear and aircraft engines, others were producing fuzes and tank parts (Senking-Factory), torpedoes (Ahlborn AG) and rubber products such as lifejackets and inflatable dinghies (Wetzell Gummiwerke). In the Hildesheim forest southwest of the city a subsidiary of Robert Bosch GmbH with the code name "ELFI" (Elektro- und Feinmechanische Industrie, Electrical and Precision Engineering Industry; from 1942 to 1952: Trillke-Factory) manufactured starters, generators and other components for lorry/truck and tank engines. 
There was also a goods station/marshalling (classification) yard in Hildesheim.

July 29, 1944
During the first air raid on Hildesheim the sugar refinery received heavy damage and the marshalling yard was slightly damaged. 34 people were killed. The city itself remained undamaged.

August 12, 1944
Twenty explosive and 80 incendiary bombs were dropped on Hildesheim at night. The sugar refinery was damaged again and the Vereinigte Deutsche Metallwerke (United German Metalworks) were slightly damaged. A few bombs hit Südstadt, a residential area in the Southern part of the city where one house was destroyed and five heavily damaged. Several bombs hit the camp where the POWs were sleeping and 10 of them were killed.

November 26, 1944
Between 11 a.m. and 1.30 p.m. a few bombs were dropped on the forests in the west of Hildesheim and on the city itself. Hildesheim was probably an alternate target. Nobody was killed, but a few houses were damaged in the city center, which was hit for the first time. One house was destroyed in Steinbergviertel, a residential area in the Southwestern part of Hildesheim.

February 13, 1945
An aerial mine was dropped on a tennis court at night. Nobody was killed, but hundreds of roofs were damaged in the city center and in the Southern and Southwestern residential areas.

February 22, 1945 (Operation Clarion)
As part of the Allied Operation Clarion (destruction of German traffic centres in smaller cities) the marshalling yard in Hildesheim was targeted in the afternoon of February 22, 1945. Due to good weather and clear sight the marshalling yard was heavily damaged, the city itself received considerable damage: 102 houses were destroyed, and 106 houses and two churches (St. Bernward's Church and St. Lamberti Church) suffered severe damage. 998 houses and four churches, among them the Cathedral and Saint Michael's Church which were declared World Heritage Site in 1985, were slightly damaged.
About 250 people were killed.

March 3, 1945
On March 3, 1945, Hildesheim was an alternate target when the city of Braunschweig was bombed. A total of 583 explosive bombs were dropped on Oststadt, a residential area in the Eastern part of the city. 51 houses were destroyed and 58 suffered severe damage. 22 houses were slightly damaged and 52 people were killed.

March 14, 1945
On March 14, 1945, elements of the 1st Air Division bombed several targets in the area around Hanover. Among these were the Vereinigte Deutsche Metallwerke (VDM) and again the marshalling yard in Hildesheim. While the marshalling yard was hit hard again and disabled for several days, the bombers missed VDM and instead bombed the Senking metal works, destroying the factory. About 150 people were killed, including 60 POWs. In the city itself, 18 houses were destroyed and 20 suffered severe damage. 109 houses were slightly damaged.

March 22, 1945
On March 22, 1945, Hildesheim was the key target of the Allied Bomber Command. British and Canadian bomber aircraft were ordered "to destroy built up area with associated industries and railway facilities."
At 2 a.m. about 250 bomber aircraft started the attack. In the following 15 minutes, they dropped a total of 438.8 tons of high explosive and 624 tons of incendiary bombs.
Almost 74% of the buildings in Hildesheim were destroyed or damaged during the attack, including nearly the entire historical city centre. 26.8% of the houses remained undamaged. The Cathedral, Saint Michael's Church and St. Lamberti were destroyed, among others. The centre, which had retained its medieval character until then, was almost levelled. Although the famous historic center had little military significance, two months before the end of the war in Europe it was chosen to be destroyed in order to shatter the will to defend as part of the area bombing directive.

Around 1,500 civilians were killed in the March attacks. About 500 of them could not be identified.

After the war

As people were suffering, 34,000 people or 46% of the city's population had remained homeless. Reconstruction started on 12 June 1945 when the first ruins were demolished, and the first houses were rebuilt on 26 June 1945. By February 1947 350 houses had been rebuilt.

As in many cities, preference was given to quickly build housing, and concrete structures took the place of the destroyed buildings. The churches, two of them now UNESCO World Heritage Sites, were all rebuilt in the original style after the war. The reconstruction of the Cathedral took ten years (1950-1960). Saint Michael's Church, another World Heritage Site, was rebuilt from 1946 to 1960. During the war, the valuable world heritage had been hidden in the basement of the city wall. In the 1980s a reconstruction of the historic centre began. Some of the unattractive concrete buildings around the historic market place were torn down and replaced by replicas of the Butchers' Guild Hall and the other original buildings. In the fall of 2007, a decision was made to reconstruct the "Umgestülpter Zuckerhut" ("Upended Sugarloaf"), an iconic half-timbered house famous for its unusual shape. It was completed in October 2010.

Footnotes

References
Hermann Meyer-Hartmann, Zielpunkt 52092N 09571O: Der Raum Hildesheim im Luftkrieg 1939-1945. Hildesheim: Bernward Verlag, 1985, .

Hildesheim
20th century in Lower Saxony
1944 in Germany
1945 in Germany
Hildesheim
Hildesheim
Firebombings
Hildesheim
Germany–United Kingdom military relations
March 1945 events